Christiaan Rudolf de Wet (7 October 1854 – 3 February 1922) was a Boer general, rebel leader and politician.

Life
Born on the Leeuwkop farm, in the district of Smithfield in the Boer Republic of the Orange Free State, he later resided at Dewetsdorp, named after his father, Jacobus Ignatius de Wet. He married a woman named, Cornelia Margaretha Krüger, and together they had 16 children. He also had a grandson that was born 2 years after his death, named, Carel de Wet.

Military career
De Wet served in the first Anglo-Boer War of 1880–81 as a field cornet, taking part in the Battle of Majuba Hill, in which the Boers achieved a victory over the British forces under Major General Sir George Pomeroy Colley. This eventually led to the end of the war and the reinstatement of the independence of the Zuid-Afrikaansche Republiek, more commonly known as the Transvaal Republic.

In the years between the First and Second Boer Wars, from 1881 to 1896, he lived on his farm, becoming a member of the Volksraad in 1897.

Second Boer War
In September 1899, de Wet and his three sons were called up as ordinary private burghers without any rank. He was a member of the Heilbron kommando and they were ordered to proceed to the Natal frontier. On 11 October 1899, while he was reconnoitring the Natal frontier, De Wet was elected vice-commandant of Heilbron. He participated in the fight at Nicholson's Nek on 30 October, when 954 British officers and men surrendered. Thereafter, he took part in the Siege of Ladysmith.

On 9 December 1899, De Wet received a telegram from the State President, M.T. Steyn, informing him that he had been appointed a fighting general and was to proceed to the Western frontier. He found General Piet Cronjé in command of the Boer forces ensconced at Magersfontein, south of Kimberley, while the English were at the Modder River. De Wet was to be Cronje's second-in-command. The British advance commenced on 11 February 1900, with General French outflanking Cronje at Magersfontein and riding towards Kimberley. De Wet's raid on the ox wagon convoy at Watervals Drift, capturing 1600 oxen, did not stem the tide. The Siege of Kimberley was relieved on 15 February, and Cronjé surrendered with 4000 men at Paardeberg on 27 February. Shortly thereafter, de Wet was appointed Commander-in-Chief of the Free State forces. They could not contain the British advance towards the Free State capital, Bloemfontein, which was taken unopposed on 13 March 1900.

His next successful action was the surprise attack on Sanna's Post near Bloemfontein on 31 March 1900. That was followed on 4 April by the victory of Reddersburg.  De Wet came to be regarded as the most formidable leader of the Boers in their guerrilla warfare. Sometimes severely handled by the British, sometimes escaping only by the narrowest of margins from the columns which attempted to surround him, and falling upon and annihilating isolated British posts, De Wet continued his successful career to the end of the war, striking heavily where he could, and evading every attempt to bring him to bay. His brother, Piet Daniel De Wet, another successful Boer general, was captured by the British in July 1901 and subsequently served against Christiaan as a member of the National Scouts, who were Boers serving with the British forces.

During the last phase of the war, the Afrikaner people of Winburg taunted the local British Army garrison with an English-language parody of Sir Walter Scott's Bonnie Dundee:

<poem>
De Wet he is mounted, he rides up the street
The English skedaddle an A1 retreat!
And the commander swore: They've got through the net
That's been spread with such care for Christiaan De Wet.

There are hills beyond Winburg and Boers on each hill
Sufficient to thwart ten generals' skill
There are stout-hearted burghers 10,000 men set
On following the Mausers of Christian De Wet.

Then away to the hills, to the veld, to the rocks
Ere we own a usurper we'll crouch with the fox
And tremble false Jingoes amidst all your glee
Ye have not seen the last of my Mausers and me!</poem>

De Wet took an active part in the peace negotiations of 1902. On 30 May 1902, he briefly took on the role of acting State President of the Orange Free State, when President Steyn had to leave the negotiations due to illness. De Wet was one of the signatories of the Treaty of Vereeniging.

Political career
At the conclusion of the war he visited Europe with other Boer generals. While in England the generals unsuccessfully sought a modification of the peace terms concluded in Pretoria. De Wet wrote an account of his campaigns, an English version of which appeared in November 1902 under the title De Stryd tusschen Boer en Brit (Three Years War). In November 1907, he was elected a member of the first parliament of the Orange River Colony and was appointed Minister of Agriculture. In 1908-9 he was a delegate to the Closer Union Convention.

De Wet was one of the leaders of the Maritz Rebellion which broke out in 1914. He was defeated at Mushroom Valley by General Botha on 12 November 1914, taken prisoner by CMDT Jorrie Jordaan (the commanding officer was Colonel Brits) on 1 December on a farm called Waterbury in the Northwest province near Tosca. The general remarked: "Thank God it is not an Englishman who captured me after all". He was sentenced to a term of six years imprisonment, with a fine of £2000 (£ in ). He was released after one year's imprisonment, after giving a written promise to take no further part in politics.

A monument/needle was erected at Waterbury and consecrated by his grandson Dr Carel de Wet on 14 February 1970, who was then minister of Health.

De Wet progressively weakened and at length, on 3 February 1922, he died on his farm. General Smuts, who had become Prime Minister, cabled his widow: "A prince and a great man has fallen today." De Wet was given a state funeral in Bloemfontein and buried next to President Steyn and Emily Hobhouse at the foot of the memorial to the Boers who died in British concentration camps. On the 100th anniversary of his birth, a bronze equestrian statue, by Coert Steynberg, was unveiled at the Raadzaal in Bloemfontein.

Legacy

De Wet had distinguished himself in the Second Boer War and earned a reputation for bravery in the many battles that he fought in that conflict, and for that, it has also memorialised him in many other forms.

In popular culture
De Wet was a close personal friend of Helene Kröller-Müller (1869-1939), who commissioned a statue of him in the Hoge Veluwe National Park in the Netherlands. 
Rudyard Kipling's 1903 poem Ubique mentions de Wet.
General De Wet is praised and his British Army enemies are mocked in George Desmond Hodnett's 1958 Irish folk song Take Her Up to Monto: 
"You've seen the Dublin Fusiliers, 
The dirty old bamboozeleers, 
De Wet'll kill them chiselers, one, two, three. 
Marching from the Linen Hall 
There's one for every cannonball, 
And Vicky's going to send them all, o'er the sea.
But first go up to Monto, Monto, Monto  
March them up to Monto, lan-ge-roo,  
To you!"

Bibliography

Biographies
 Kestell, J.D. Christiaan de Wet – 'n lewensbeskrywing. De Nationale Pers Beperkt. Cape Town 1920.
 Olivier, B. Krygsman Christiaan Rudolf de Wet – 'n lewensskets van Genl. C.R. de Wet. Tafelberg. Johannesburg 1971.
 Pienaar, A.J. Christiaan Rudolf de Wet in die Anglo-Boere oorlog. Unpublished M.A.-thesis, PU for CHE. 1974.
 Rosenthal, E. General De Wet – A Biography. Simondium. Cape Town 1968.
 Scholtz, Leopold. Generaal Christiaan de Wet as Veldheer. Protea. Pretoria 2003.
 Van Schoor, M.C.E. Christiaan Rudolf de Wet – Krygsman en Volksman. Protea. Pretoria 2007.

Publications
 De Wet, Der Kampf zwischen Bur und Brite – Der dreijährige Krieg, (Leipzig, 1902)
 De Wet, Three Years' War. (Charles Scribner's Sons N.Y., 1902) [Translated from German] (digital copy at Project Gutenberg)
 De Wet, Christiaan Rudolf, Three Years War (October 1899 – June 1902), Archibald Constable and Co Ltd, Westminster, 1902.

References

 P. J. Sampson, Capture of De Wet and the South African Rebellion of 1914. (London, 1915)

Citations

External links

 
 
  at the War Museum of the Boer Republics.
 

1854 births
1922 deaths
People from Mohokare Local Municipality
Afrikaner people
People of the First Boer War
Orange Free State generals
South African military personnel
State Presidents of the Orange Free State
Orange Free State military personnel of the Second Boer War
Members of the Volksraad of the Orange Free State
Boer generals